Thomas Ruscher (1449–1510) was a Roman Catholic prelate who served as Auxiliary Bishop of Mainz (1502–1510).

Biography
Ruscher was born in 1449 in Schwäbisch Gmünd, Germany. On 19 Dec 1502, he was appointed during the papacy of Pope Alexander VI as Auxiliary Bishop of Mainz and Titular Bishop of Venecompensis. On 19 Mar 1503, he was consecrated bishop by Berthold von Henneberg, Archbishop of Mainz. He served as Auxiliary Bishop of Mainz until his death on 8 Aug 1510. While bishop, he was the principal consecrator of Jakob von Liebenstein, Archbishop of Mainz (1505).

References

External links and additional sources
 (for Chronology of Bishops) 
 (for Chronology of Bishops) 
 (for Chronology of Bishops)  

16th-century German Roman Catholic bishops
Bishops appointed by Pope Alexander VI
1449 births
1510 deaths